Rothermel is a surname. Notable people with the surname include:

Addison Rothermel (1892–1958), American film actor and director
Bobby Rothermel (1870–1927), American infielder in Major League Baseball in 1899
John Hoover Rothermel (1856–1922), Democratic member of the U.S. House of Representatives from Pennsylvania
P. Frederick Rothermel (1850–1929), Pennsylvania lawyer and politician
Paula Rothermel (born 1963), leading UK academic in the field of home education
Peter F. Rothermel (1817–1895), American painter
Rolf Hans Rothermel, British architect